William D. Underwood has been the eighteenth President of Mercer University since 2006. He was the interim President of Baylor University from 2005 to 2006.

Biography

Underwood graduated from Oklahoma Baptist University and received a J.D. from the University of Illinois in 1985. He was an editor of the University of Illinois Law Review and a member of the Order of the Coif. He clerked for the Honorable Sam D. Johnson of the United States Court of Appeals for the Fifth Circuit.  Underwood then joined the firm of Carrington, Coleman, Sloman and Blumenthal in Dallas, Texas.   In 1990, he became a law professor at Baylor University.  While a professor at the law school, he served as interim President of Baylor University from 2005 to 2006. Since 2006, he has served as the President of Mercer University.

Underwood has been involved with the American Law Institute, the American Bar Foundation, the Texas Bar Foundation, the Atlanta Regional Consortium on Higher Education, the Tubman Museum, the Georgia Cancer Coalition, the Georgia Chamber of Commerce, the International Association of Baptist Colleges and Universities, the American Baptist Historical Society, and MidCountry Financial Corporation. Underwood is a Baptist.

References

Living people
Year of birth missing (living people)
Baptists from the United States
Oklahoma Baptist University alumni
University of Illinois alumni
Presidents of Baylor University
Presidents of Mercer University
University of Illinois College of Law alumni